Víctor Sendín Huelves (born 1 July 1975) is a Spanish former professional tennis player.

Sendín, who turned professional in 1995, reached a career best ranking of 242 in the world. During his career he featured in the qualifying draws for both the French Open and Wimbledon Championships.

In 1996 he qualified for two ATP Tour main draws, debuting at the Barcelona Open. He had an opening round win over former top 10 player Andrei Chesnokov, before being eliminated in the second round. His other appearance came at the 1996 German Open in Hamburg.

Notes

References

External links
 
 

1975 births
Living people
Spanish male tennis players